TNL may refer to:
 Lenakel language, spoken in Vanuatu
 National Liberal Youth (Romania), the youth organisation of the National Liberal Party of Romania
 Ternopil Airport, serving Ternopil, Ukraine
 TNL TV, a television channel in Sri Lanka
 Toronto Northern Lights, a Toronto, Ontario-based men's chorus
 Tramway de Nice et du Littoral, a public transportation system in Nice, France
 TNL (political party), a political party in Australia